Abyssoanthus is a genus of cnidarians, the only genus in the family Abyssoanthidae.

Species include:
Abyssoanthus convallis Reimer & Sinniger, 2010
Abyssoanthus nankaiensis Reimer & Fujiwara in Reimer, Sinniger, Fujiwara, Hirano & Maruyama, 2007

References

Zoantharia
Hexacorallia genera